The High Commission of Togo in London, England, is the diplomatic mission of Togo in the United Kingdom.

As of 2021, Togo's Ambassador to the United Kingdom of Great Britain and Northern Ireland is Komlavi Dedji.

References

External links
Official website

Year of establishment missing
Togo
London
Togo–United Kingdom relations
Buildings and structures in the London Borough of Islington